Martin Riesen (8 July 1926 – 13 September 2003) was a Swiss professional ice hockey goaltender who represented the Swiss national team at the 1956 Winter Olympics.

References

1926 births
2003 deaths
Swiss ice hockey goaltenders
Ice hockey players at the 1956 Winter Olympics
Olympic ice hockey players of Switzerland